The Correcaminos UAT Victoria (English: UAT Victoria Roadrunners)  is a Mexican professional basketball team. It has been a member of the LNBP since the 2000 season.

History 
Correcaminos UAT Victoria was founded in 1995 as a founding member of the Conferencia de Básquetbol Profesional (CBP). They joined Circuito Mexicano de Básquetbol (CIMEBA) in 1997, and then the Liga Nacional de Baloncesto Profesional in 2000. It was the champion in 2002, and reached the league finals twice. Correcaminos is owned by the Autonomous University of Tamaulipas. In 2017, it was profiled in an ESPN article, during which season it finished last in the league. However, forward Grandy Glaze led the league in rebounding.

Gymnasium
The UAT Victoria Correcaminos play their home games in the Gimnasio Multidisciplinario UAT Victoria, also known as "El Nido", which has a capacity for 3,500 people.

Players

Current roster

Notable players

  J. R. Giddens
  Oliver Lafayette

References

External links 
 Official twitter

Basketball teams in Mexico
Ciudad Victoria
Sports teams in Tamaulipas
Basketball teams established in 1995
1995 establishments in Mexico